Arquibaldo e sua Turma was a comic book, released in 1975 by Brazilian publisher Vecchi. The comic book published stories of titles already released by Archie Comics, such as Archie, Archie and Me, Archie's Girls Betty and Veronica, Archie's TV Laugh-Out, Reggie and Me, Sabrina, the Teenage Witch and others. It was the second publication of comics with licensed characters from Archie Comics in Brazil, the first was between 1954–1955, by Orbis, titled Frajola, which has 23 issues published. Arquibaldo e sua Turma have only 11 issues published, being the shortest publication in the country. First published May 1975 and last published December 1976.

The characters in this comic had their names changed, Archie Andrews was called "Arquibaldo". Jughead Jones had his name changed to "Moleza" and Archie's rival Reggie Mantle was called "Rick". Other characters like Betty Cooper and Veronica Lodge have just their names translated from English to Portuguese.

References

Brazilian comic strips
Archie Comics titles
1975 comics debuts
1976 comics endings
Magazines established in 1975
Magazines disestablished in 1976
Teen comedy comics
Romantic comedy comics
Defunct magazines published in Brazil
Monthly magazines published in Brazil